Danièle Mazet-Delpeuch is a French chef perhaps best known for her stint as the first female chef for the President of France.

Personal life
Mazet-Delpeuch is a native of the Périgord region of France.

Culinary career
Since the 1970s, Mazet-Delpeuch has been a culinary teacher, and was noted as a pioneer of culinary tourism in France. She eventually got the attention of Joël Robuchon, who recommended her to then French President François Mitterrand. She served as Mitterrand's personal chef from 1988 to 1990. In that role, she cooked dinners for Mitterrand's family, as wells as guests such as Mikhail Gorbachev and Margaret Thatcher.

10 years after her stint as Mitterrand's chef, Mazet-Delpeuch worked as a cook for a French research base in the Crozet islands for over a year. She applied for the job after seeing an ad online, and despite being told they were not looking for a woman or someone over the age of 50 (Mazet-Delpeuch was 60 at the time), she got the job.

Books
 Carnets de cuisine: du Périgord a l'Elysee
 Ma cuisine, de l'Elysée à l'Antarctique (2016)

Cultural depiction
A character based on Mazet-Delpeuch, named Hortense Laborie, was portrayed by Catherine Frot in the 2012 film Haute Cuisine. In France, the film is known as Les Saveurs du Palais.

References

French chefs
1942 births
Living people
Women chefs